Club Filter, based upstairs at the Lounge bar and nightclub at 243 Swanston Street in the heart of Melbourne, holds the record as the city's (and also Australia's) longest-running techno music night, having run every Wednesday night from 1992 to 2003.

Background

Run by two DJs [Jason] Rudeboy (who pioneered one of the earliest underground music nights at Commerce Club, the infamous Class War free raves and then went on to run the BBoy Discotheque experimenting in the original sounds of rap) and Hot Rod (a long-time announcer on a radio show called Tronik Voodoo Exorcism on 3PBS-FM also known as Mad Rod), the night reflected the cutting edge of global styles in techno and club music. Borrowing heavily from the gay scene, they lent towards the obscure and taboo performing arts. The club always regularly had shows and live performances from electro poets to male strippers and drag shows. Early on pursuing a more acid house sound, pre-nascent hardcore techno and drum & bass, then filtering across into the sounds of Detroit, Chicago, New York, Berlin, Cologne, London, Sweden, Scotland, and - of course - Melbourne. Filter's sound also cut across record labels as varied as Djax, Force Inc., Tresor, Relief, Axis, Purpose Maker, Sativae, Mosquito, Nova Mute, Valve, Drumcode, Stayupforever, and Pharma.

Dom Phillips, the editor of the UK's Mixmag, visited the club in late 1995 and referred to it in a subsequent article on Melbourne's underground scene thus: "Filter is a wicked club, one of those long-running midweek specials that are, somehow, always cool. ... Some things are international."

Zebra Magazine, the dance/nightclub music insert in Melbourne's Inpress, wrote in 1997 that "Club Filter at the Lounge has virtually established itself as a cultural icon within Melbourne's dance music fraternity." In June 2001 the club celebrated its ninth anniversary with a webcast to a dance music site.

International and local DJs and live acts

International DJs and live acts played a key role in the club's development. Among them were Claude Young, Jammin' Unit, Dave Angel, Colin Dale, Rob Gee, Biochip C, Khan Oral (Bizz OD), Ree.K, Stacey Pullen, Lenny Dee, Space Dj'z, Dave the Drummer and Joey Beltram.

But just as importantly, Filter set about supporting and nurturing local live talents and DJs, including Terrence Ho (H2O), Steve Law (Zen Paradox), Voiteck, Honeysmack, Andrez Bergen (Little Nobody), Soulenoid, Guyver 3, Liz Millar, Arthur Arkin, Ollie Olsen, Bwana, Scott Alert, DJ Trooper, Nick Dem Q, Ransom, Cara Caama, Lani G, DJ Ides, Dee Dee, Halo Produkshuns, Slieker, Richie Rich (Richard MacNeill), Zanna Mazzitelli, Andrew Till, Eden, Fiery Eye, Dan Woodman, Derek Shiel, Dom Hogan, Toupee, RSK, Miss Krystal, Graham Mono, Juju Space Jazz, Krang, 8-Bit, Ben Shepherd, Katy K, Matt Sykes, Rob Wu, MBug and Blimp.

Filter also collaborated regularly with other Melbourne-based labels such as IF? Records, Psy-Harmonics, Smelly Records, and Messy Creations.

The success of the night lay mainly in the fact that it was able to regenerate itself constantly as the music worldwide did. Often criticized for bringing to the 'scene' trends in music too early, this inevitably helped the club to continue its long reign for over 11 years. The new music was enjoyed by people, of all ages, who were not necessarily into the socially excepted techno that mainstream raves and clubs had to offer, but could now enjoy current world trends before money hungry promoters waited until it was commercially viable before bringing out acts or style jumping to gain credibility. It could also be said that the fact it was a mid-week party, that the club never stepped on anyone's toes and was given the free range it needed to explore diverse avenues of entertainment.

The club closed by mutual consent in 2003.

"Earlier this year a blank stare of disbelief swept over Melbourne’s dance community as news spread that after 11 years and nearly 600 consecutive Wednesdays later, the most enduring club in worldwide electronic music – Club Filter - would be closing forever," reported DJ Ides that same year in an online article at Australian music website inthemix.com.au.

Filter was superseded in November 2003 by Jack the Basics, which was operated by another long running Melbourne techno outfit, the Melbourne Techno Collective. Despite some early success, Jack the Basics never managed to live up to its predecessor and was abandoned in late 2004.

See also

List of electronic dance music venues

References

Nightclubs in Melbourne
Music venues in Melbourne
Electronic dance music venues
Clubs and societies in Victoria (Australia)